Chrysopa nigricornis is a species of green lacewing in the family Chrysopidae. It is found in Central America and North America.

References

Further reading

External links

 

Chrysopidae
Articles created by Qbugbot
Insects described in 1839